Cashmere Nicole Carillo (born ), known professionally as Cashmere Nicole, is an American entrepreneur and founder of the beauty brand, Beauty Bakerie. She launched her company in 2011 with the goal of making a vegan, cruelty-free beauty brand catering to women of color.

Personal life 
Nicole was born  and raised in South Bend, Indiana. She became pregnant with her daughter, Jasmyn, at the age of 16, and became a nurse after graduating from college. In 2012, Nicole was diagnosed with breast cancer. This influenced her decision to focus on creating cruelty-free, nontoxic beauty products. She underwent a double mastectomy in 2014 when the cancer returned.

Career 

Nicole began developing beauty products while she died as a nurse and officially launched her company, Beauty Bakerie, in 2011. As of 2017, Beauty Bakerie products are sold in over 120 countries and over 2000 stores. The brand has been worn by endorsed by Tati Westbrook, Jackie Aina and Nikkie Tutorials. In 2014, Nicole's story was featured on Beyoncé's website, Beyonce.com, as part of Breast Cancer Awareness Month.
 The firm is based in San Diego and promoted by Gabby Douglas. In October 2017, Unilever Ventures invested in the brand along with 5 Black Billionaires to include Ken Chennault, former CEO of American Express and Rich Dennis of New Voices Fund. This initial investment made Nicole the 14th Black woman to receive over $1M in funding. By 2022, the Founder had successfully raised over $14M.

References 

American businesspeople
African-American businesspeople
People from South Bend, Indiana
American nurses
American philanthropists
Year of birth missing (living people)
Living people
21st-century African-American people